Les Géants is a novel written in French by French Nobel laureate J. M. G. Le Clézio and translated into English as The Giants. It was published by Atheneum and Jonathan Cape.

Publication history

First French Edition

Second French Edition

First English translation US. Edition

First English translation United Kingdom Edition

References

External links
A "Google Books search" accesses the contents of the book as well as giving a list of places mentioned in the book and accesses some book reviews

1973 French novels
Novels by J. M. G. Le Clézio
Works by J. M. G. Le Clézio
French speculative fiction novels
Éditions Gallimard books